This is a list of notable events in music that took place in the year 1921.

Specific locations
1921 in British music
1921 in Norwegian music

Specific genres
1921 in country music
1921 in jazz

Events
January – Amelita Galli-Curci marries her accompanist, Homer Samuels, who had been named in her divorce from the Marchese Luigi Curci.
June–July – The Harvard Glee Club takes its first trip to Europe, garnering international press attention.
November – A month before his death, Camille Saint-Saëns, 86, gives a final recital.
 Clarence Williams makes his first recordings
 Mary Stafford becomes the first black woman to record for Columbia Records
 The 17-string koto, or "Jūshichi-gen", is invented by Michio Miyagi.
 Cyril Rootham dedicates his "Suite in Three Movements" for flute and piano to French flautist Louis Fleury.

Published popular music

 "Ain't We Got Fun?"     w.m. Richard A. Whiting, Raymond Egan & Gus Kahn
 "All by Myself"     w.m. Irving Berlin
 "And Her Mother Came Too"     w. Dion Titheradge m. Ivor Novello
 "Any Time"     w.m. Herbert Happy Lawson
 "April Showers"     w. B. G. De Sylva m. Louis Silvers
 "Baltimore Buzz"     w.m. Noble Sissle & Eubie Blake
 "Bandana Days"     w.m. Noble Sissle & Eubie Blake
 "Bimini Bay"     w. Gus Kahn & Raymond Egan m. Richard Whiting
 "Boy Wanted"   w. Ira Gershwin m. George Gershwin
 "Dancing Time"     w.(Eng) George Grossmith, Jr. (US) Howard Dietz m. Jerome Kern US words written 1924.
 "Dapper Dan"     w. Lew Brown m. Albert Von Tilzer
 "Dear Old Southland"     w. Henry Creamer m. Turner Layton
 "Dirty Hands, Dirty Face" w. Al Jolson, Grant Clarke, Edgar Leslie  m. James V. Monaco
 "Down South" w. B. G. DeSylva m. Walter Donaldson.  Introduced by Al Jolson in the musical Bombo
 "Down Yonder"     w.m. L. Wolfe Gilbert
 "Everybody Step"     w.m. Irving Berlin 
 "Hawaiian Chimes" w. Irving Bibo m. Eva Applefield
 "I Ain't Nobody's Darling"     w. Elmer Hughes m. Robert A. King
 "I Found A Rose In The Devil's Garden"     w.m. Fred Fisher & Willie Raskin
 "I Wonder If You Still Care For Me"     w.m. Harry B. Smith & Francis Wheeler
 "I'll Forget You"     w. Annelu Burns m. Ernest R. Ball
 "I'm Just Wild About Harry"     w.m. Noble Sissle & Eubie Blake
 "I'm Missin' Mammy's Kissin'"     w. Sidney Clare m. Lew Pollack
 "I'm Nobody's Baby"     w.m. Benny Davis, Milton Ager & Lester Santly
 "Jazz Me Blues"     m. Tom Delaney
 "Keep Movin'"     Helen Trix
 "Kitten On The Keys"     m. Zez Confrey
 "Laughin' Rag"     S. Moore, H. Skinner
 "Learn To Smile"     w. Otto Harbach m. Louis A. Hirsch
 "Leave Me With A Smile"     w.m. Charles Koehler & Earl Burtnett
 "Love Will Find A Way"     w.m. Noble Sissle & Eubie Blake 
 "Ma! He's Making Eyes at Me" w. Sidney Clare m. Con Conrad
 "Make Believe"     w. Benny Davis m. Jack Shilkret
 "Mandy 'N' Me"     w. Bert Kalmar m. Con Conrad
 "My Sunny Tennessee"     w.m. Bert Kalmar, Harry Ruby & Herman Ruby
 "Peggy O'Neill"     w.m. Harry Pease, Ed G. Nelson & Gilbert Dodge
 "Sally"     w. Clifford Grey m. Jerome Kern
 "Say It With Music"     w.m. Irving Berlin
 "Second Hand Rose"     w. Grant Clarke m. James F. Hanley
 "The Sheik of Araby"     w. Harry B. Smith & Francis Wheeler m. Ted Snyder
 "She's Mine, All Mine"     w.m. Bert Kalmar & Harry Ruby
 "Shuffle Along    w.m. Noble Sissle & Eubie Blake
 "Shimmy With Me"      w. P. G. Wodehouse m. Jerome Kern from the musical The Cabaret Girl
 "Song Of Love"     w. Dorothy Donnelly m. Sigmund Romberg
 "Strut Miss Lizzie"     w. Henry Creamer m. Turner Layton
 "Swanee River Moon"     w.m. H. Pitman Clarke
 "Sweet Lady"     w. Howard Johnson m. Frank Crumit & Dave Zoob
 "Ten Little Fingers And Ten Little Toes"     w. Harry Pease & Johnny White m. Ira Schuster & Ed G. Nelson
 "There'll Be Some Changes Made"     w. Billy Higgins m. Benton Overstreet
 "Tuck Me To Sleep In My Old 'Tucky Home"     w. Sam H. Lewis & Joe Young m. George W. Meyer
 "Wabash Blues"     w. Dave Ringle m. Fred Meinken
 "When Big Profundo Sang Low C"     w. Marion T. Bohannon m. George Botsford
 "When Buddha Smiles"     w. Arthur Freed m. Nacio Herb Brown
 "When Francis Dances With Me"     w. Ben Ryan m. Sol Violinsky
 "When Shall We Meet Again"     w. Raymond B. Egan m. Richard A. Whiting
 "Whip-poor-will"     w. B. G. De Sylva m. Jerome Kern
 "Yoo-Hoo"     w. B. G. De Sylva m. Al Jolson

Top Popular Recordings 1921

The following songs achieved the highest positions in Joel Whitburn's Pop Memories 1890-1954 and record sales reported on the "Discography of American Historical Recordings" website during 1921:
Numerical rankings are approximate, they are only used as a frame of reference.

Classical music
Agustín Barrios – La Catedral
George Enescu – Symphony No. 3 in C major, Op. 21 (revised version)
Gabriel Fauré
Cello Sonata No. 2
Piano Quintet No. 2 in C minor, Op. 115
John Foulds – A World Requiem (1919–21; premiered 1923)
Howard Hanson – Before the Night
Albert Ketèlbey
Bells Across the Meadows
In a Persian Market
Rued Langgaard – Music of the Spheres
Carl Nielsen – Moderen (stage music)
Henrique Oswald – String Quartet No. 4 in C minor, Op. 46
Willem Pijper
Symphony No. 2
Trio No. 2 for violin, violoncello & piano
Sergei Prokofiev – Piano Concerto No. 3 in C Major
Camille Saint-Saëns
Oboe Sonata, Op. 166
Clarinet Sonata, Op. 167
Bassoon Sonata, Op. 168
Edgard Varèse
Offrandes
Amériques (1918–21)
Ralph Vaughan Williams
The Lark Ascending, version for violin & orchestra
A Pastoral Symphony
Heitor Villa-Lobos – Fantasia de Movimentos Mistos, for violin & orchestra
Arnold Schoenberg – Suite for Piano Op. 25
John Ireland – Two Pieces for Piano

Opera
Franco Alfano – La leggenda di Sakùntala
Nicolae Bretan – Luceafarul
Paul Hindemith – Mörder, Hoffnung der Frauen and Das Nusch-Nuschi (premiered together June 4 at Württembergisches Landestheater, Stuttgart)
Leoš Janáček – Káťa Kabanová
Hans Jelmoli – Die Badener Fahrt
Emmerich Kálmán – Die Bajadere
Pietro Mascagni – Il piccolo Marat

Film
Paul Hindemith - Im Kampf mit dem Berge

Jazz

Musical theater

 Bombo, Broadway production opened at Jolson's 59th Street Theatre on October 6 and ran for 213 performances
 The Broadway Whirl, Broadway revue opened at the Times Square Theatre on June 8 and ran for 85 performances
 The Golden Moth (Music: Ivor Novello)  London production opened at the Adelphi Theatre on October 5.  Starring Bobbie Comber and Thorpe Bates.
 Good Morning, Dearie, Broadway production opened at the Globe Theatre on November 1 and ran for 347 performances
 Pot Luck London production opened at the Vaudeville Theatre on December 24.
 The League of Notions London revue opened at the Oxford Theatre on January 17
 The Rebel Maid London production opened at the Empire Theatre on March 12 and ran for 114 performances.
 The Rose Girl (Music: Anselm Goetzl Book & Lyrics: William Carey Duncan) Broadway production opened at the Ambassador Theatre on February 11 and ran for 99 performances.  Starring Mabel Withee, Charles Purcell and May Boley.
 Sally, London production opened at the Winter Garden Theatre on September 10 and ran for 387 performances
 Shuffle Along, Broadway production opened at the Daly's 63rd Street Theatre on May 23 and ran for 504 performances
 Sybil, London production opened at Daly's Theatre on February 19 and ran for 346 performances

Births
January 10 – Helen Bonchek Schneyer, folk musician (d. 2005)
January 17 – Lorna Cooke deVaron, choral conductor (d. 2018)
January 22 – Arno Babajanian, composer (d. 1983)
January 26 – Eddie Barclay, music producer (d. 2005)
January 31
Carol Channing, musical comedy star (d. 2019)
Mario Lanza, operatic tenor and film star (d. 1959)
February 5 – Sir John Pritchard, British conductor (d. 1989)
February 13 –  Jeanne Demessieux, French organist and composer (d. 1968)
February 16 – Vera-Ellen, dancer and actress (d. 1981)
February 20 - Ruth Gipps, composer (d. 1999)
February 26 – Betty Hutton, actress and singer (d. 2007)
March 2 – Robert Simpson, musicologist and composer (d. 1997)
March 6 – Julius Rudel, conductor (d. 2014)
March 8 – Cyd Charisse, dancer (d. 2008)
March 11 – Ástor Piazzolla, tango composer (d. 1992)
March 12 – Gordon MacRae, singer and actor (d. 1986)
March 21
Arthur Grumiaux, violinist (d. 1986)
Antony Hopkins, composer and music writer (d. 2014)
March 22 – Nino Manfredi, actor and film score composer (d. 2004)
March 27 – Phil Chess, born Fiszel Czyż, record producer (d. 2016)
March 28 - Rostislav Berberov, music theorist and musicologist (d. 1984) 
April 1
Douglas Allanbrook, composer (d. 2003)
William Bergsma, composer (d. 1994)
Arthur "Guitar Boogie" Smith, musician and composer (d. 2014)
April 3 – Darío Moreno, Turkish singer and composer (d. 1968)
April 8
Alfie Bass, actor (Tevye in West End production of Fiddler on the Roof) (d. 1987)
Franco Corelli, operatic tenor (d. 2003)
April 22 – Cándido Camero, percussionist (d. 2020)
April 26 – Jimmy Giuffre, jazz musician (d. 2008)
May 17
Dennis Brain, horn virtuoso (d. 1957)
Bob Merrill, US songwriter (d. 1998)
May 23 – Humphrey Lyttelton, English jazz musician (d. 2008)
May 25 – Hal David – US lyricist (d. 2012)
May 26 – Inge Borkh, German soprano (d. 2018)
June 1 – Nelson Riddle, US conductor, composer and arranger (d. 1985)
June 3 – Betty Freeman, patron of classical music (d. 2009)
June 21
Judy Holliday, US actress and singer (d. 1965)
Jane Russell, US actress and singer (d. 2011)
June 24 – Peggy DeCastro, US singer born in the Dominican Republic, eldest of the DeCastro Sisters (d. 2004)
June 25 – Celia Franca, dancer and choreographer (d. 2007)
July 12 – Hilary Corke, writer and composer (d. 2001)
July 15 – Jack Beeson, American pianist and composer (d. 2010)
July 17 
George Barnes, American swing jazz guitarist (d. 1977)
Mary Osborne, American jazz guitarist (d. 1992)
July 20 – Carmen Carrozza, accordionist (d. 2013)
July 24 – Giuseppe Di Stefano, opera singer (d. 2008)
July 30 – Grant Johannesen, American pianist (d. 2005)
August 3 – Richard Adler, American composer and lyricist (d. 2012)
August 4 – Herb Ellis, American guitarist (d. 2010)
August 7
Manitas de Plata, French Gitano flamenco guitarist (d. 2014)
Karel Husa, Czech-born classical composer (d. 2016)
August 9 – Lola Bobesco, Belgian violinist (d. 2003)
August 13 – Mary Lee, Scottish singer (d. 2022)
September 3 – Thurston Dart, English musicologist, conductor and keyboard player (d. 1971)
September 4 – Ariel Ramírez, Argentine composer (d. 2010)
September 8 – Sir Harry Secombe, Welsh singer and comedian (d. 2001)
September 19 – Billy Ward, R&B singer (The Dominoes) (d. 2002)
September 21 – Chico Hamilton, jazz drummer (d. 2013)
September 30 – Pedro Knight, Cuban musician, manager (d. 2007)
October 1 – James Whitmore, actor in film musicals (d. 2009)
October 21
Sir Malcolm Arnold, composer (d. 2006)
Jarmil Burghauser, conductor, composer and musicologist (d. 1997)
October 23 – Denise Duval, soprano (d. 2016)
October 25 – Little Hatch, blues musician (d. 2003)
November 5 – Georges Cziffra, pianist (d. 1994)
November 9 – Pierrette Alarie, soprano (d. 2011)
November 21 – Vivian Blaine, actress and singer (d. 1995)
November 23 – Fred Buscaglione, Italian singer, musician and songwriter (d. 1960)
December 3 – Phyllis Curtin, soprano (d. 2016)
December 4 – Deanna Durbin, singer and actress (d. 2013)
December 8 – Johnny Otis, blues musician (d. 2012)
December 15 – Alan Freed, disc jockey (d. 1965)
December 26 – Steve Allen, musician and comedian (d. 2000)

Deaths
January 23 – Władysław Żeleński, pianist, organist and composer (b. 1837)
February 8 
George Formby Sr, singer (b. 1875)
Francisco D'Andrade, opera singer (b. 1856)
March 14 – Gustave Barnes, artist and musician (b. 1877)
March 24 – Déodat de Séverac, composer (b. 1872)
April 3 – Annie Louise Cary, operatic contralto (b. 1842)
April 5 – Alphons Diepenbrock, composer and writer (b. 1862)
April 7 – Víctor Mirecki Larramat, cellist (b. 1847)
April 20 – Tony Jackson, pianist, singer and composer (b. 1876)
May 4 – Max Kalbeck, music writer and critic (b. 1850)
June 8 – Natalie Bauer-Lechner, viola player (b. 1858)
July 9 – Marianne Brandt, operatic contralto (b. 1842)
August 2 – Enrico Caruso, operatic tenor (b. 1873)
August 8 – Arthur Pougin, music critic (b. 1834)
September 27
Engelbert Humperdinck, composer (b. 1854)
Zdzisław Birnbaum, violinist and conductor (b. 1878)
September 28 – Princess Pauline von Metternich, patron of composers including Wagner and Smetana (b. 1836)
October 4 – Sophie Stehle, operatic soprano (b. 1838)
November 20 – Christina Nilsson, operatic soprano (b. 1843)
November 25 – Théodore Lack, pianist (b. 1846)
November 29 – Ivan Caryll, composer of operettas (b. 1861)
December 10 – Victor Jacobi, composer of operettas (b. 1883)
December 16 – Camille Saint-Saëns, composer (b. 1835)
December 25 – Hans Huber, composer (b. 1852)

References

 
20th century in music
Music by year